San Luis de Gaceno is a town and municipality in Boyacá Department, Colombia, part of the subregion of the Neira Province.

Municipalities of Boyacá Department